Zitzmann is a German surname. Notable people with the surname include:

Axel Zitzmann (born 1959), East German ski jumper
Billy Zitzmann (1895–1985), American baseball player

German-language surnames